The battle of Lebedyn was a series of clashes that began on 26 February 2022 at the city of Lebedyn, Sumy Raion, Sumy Oblast, as a part of the 2022 Russian invasion of Ukraine.

Timeline

26–27 February 
On the evening of 26 February, Ukrainian forces held the Russian Forces on the outskirts of the city. The Russians reportedly suffered significant losses. At 22:45, a battle began in Kamiane. Five soldiers were brought to the hospitals of Lebedyn on the morning of 27 February. Almost all of them were wounded in and around Batiutenko Street. According to the Regional Centre of Emergency Care and Disaster Medicine, no wounded civilians arrived. On the night of 27 February, 37-year-old Olexandr Smilian, born in Kapustyntsi, died in the battle of Lebedyn .

28 February 
In the afternoon, a column of Russian military vehicles went to Trostianets coming from the direction of Lebedyn. About 18:00, Ukrainian troops reportedly destroyed a Russian military base at  near Lebedyn with a Bayraktar TB2 UAV. They reportedly destroyed 96 tanks, 20 "Grad" multiple rocket launcher systems and eight tanker trucks. There were no civilians in the area. In , a local man died attempting to get into an abandoned military vehicle that had been mined.

1–3 March 
On the nights of the 1 and 2 of March, Ukrainian forces claimed to have destroyed some 100 Russian military vehicles, mainly tanks and armored personnel carriers (APCs), at Bishkyn village near Lebedyn.

On the afternoon of 3 March, the 93rd Independent Kholodnyi Yar Mechanized Brigade neutralized the Russian troops at Moskovskyi Bobryk in Lebedyn district. Several T-72B3 and T-80U tanks and APCs were disabled. While in the village, the Russians looted the local shops and private households and burnt the car of the head of the village.

About 21:00 on 3 March, the Russian troops resumed shelling Sumy and other locations in Sumy Oblast, in particular Nedryhailiv, Boromlia, Bezdryk and Lebedyn.

4–7 March 
Lebedyn was completely cut off from electricity for the 4 and 5 of March. On 5 March at 7 a.m., civilians heard an air raid alarm in Lebedyn as the Russians began shelling the city. The explosions blew out windows in multistoried buildings. The artillery shelling went on all day long. An electric substation, the Lebedyn bakery, and a gas station were destroyed by Russian shelling.

By the evening of 5 March, Russians had been reported to have captured civilians driving by cars through the countryside. Dmytro Zhyvytskyi, the Head of the Military Administration, said that people could not leave Lebedyn, Sumy, Okhtyrka and Trostianets at the moment because "the Russian troops rob and occasionally shoot at the cars of peaceful Ukrainians."

On the evening of 5 March, a column of Russian tanks arrived at Lebedyn having seized the village of Stanove near Trostianets along the way. They placed tanks in every yard along the central and side streets. According to the Head of the Military Administration Dmytro Zhyvytskyi, Russians took away people's cellphones. They broke into houses asking for food and a bath. Thus they were sheltering themselves with a human shield almost all day long.

According to the Military Administration, Russian artillery shelling and the airstrikes of 6 March left many inhabitants of Lebedyn without electricity. The prosecution launched a pre-trial investigation into the destruction of the Lebedyn bakery by the strikes of Russian military planes.

On 7 March, the electricity supply to Lebedyn was partially restored.

8–9 March 
On the night of 8 to 9 March, the Russian air forces attacked Lebedyn. Two houses in Shevchenka Street were ruined. Five people, two children among them, were retrieved from the debris. The officers of the 5th State Fire and Rescue Brigade, who were in charge that night, worked at the site from 01:45 on 9 March.

10–11 March 
By the 10 of March, the village of Vorozhba in Lebedyn district had been occupied by Russian forces. According to the Head of the Military Administration Dmytro Zhyvytskyi, Russian soldiers drove people to the streets, robbed them, looted and set fire to local houses. The Russians also pulled people out of cellars where many were hiding. "They are shielding themselves with peaceful locals against the Bayraktars," Zhyvytskyi said.

On the night of 11 March, the Russian troops shelled houses in Kerdylivschyna killing two locals – Vasyl Masliuk and Valeriy Sukhanov.

12–13 March 
"Green corridors" for evacuation functioned in Sumy Oblast on 12 March. People could go from Sumy, Trostianets, Konotop, Lebedyn, Velyka Pysarivka, and Krasnopillia through Romny to Poltava. According to the Head of the Military Administration Dmytro Zhyvytskyi, they finally managed to reach an agreement about Lebedyn, which had no electricity or communication at that point. At 9:00, a column of private transport and buses gathered at Lebedyn city council. The route was from Lebedyn via Shtepivka, Nedryhailiv, Korovyntsi, Romny, Andriyashivka, Lokhvytsia, Lubny and Poltava. Overall, 28 vehicles with 83 civilians and four buses with 52 civilians left Lebedyn.

As of 13 March, 22,500 civilians in Sumy Oblast had no electricity. According to the Military Administration, shelling damaged the power lines in Okhtyrka, Trostianets, Lebedyn and Sumy.

15 March 
On March 15, the Humanitarian Corridors worked in Sumy region on five routes - from Sumy, Trostyanets, Lebedin, Konotop and Shostka. The final destination of all routes - Lubny in Poltava region.

17 March 
From March 17 to March 25, the village of Mali Vystope was occupied. They were destroyed from the Russian military both apartment buildings and private. Local college has been caused by considerable damage. Russian invaders have been cited for eight days. Living the village on March 25, they fired at the tanks.

18 March 
Humanitarian corridors worked in Sumy region on March 18. It was possible to leave the Great Pisarivka, Trostyanets, Krasnopillya, Sumy, Lebedinsky and Konotop communities. Lebedin could leave on personal transport and buses from 9 am from the square near the city council. From the city the column moved through Shtepivka, Nedryhaylov, Korovyntsi, Romny, Andriyashivka and further to Poltava region through Lokhvitsa to Lubnov. The column was traditionally accompanied by representatives of the International Organization of the Red Cross. According to the regional military administration, as of 5:00 pm, Lebedin left: 4 buses - 50 citizens.

19–26 March 
The village of Steblyanka Sumy district from March 19 to March 26 was occupied by Russian military - there were 26 units of Russian military equipment. They pushed into the house of local residents who were not at home at the time. The invaders were pulled from houses where there were no owners, everything they saw. Where they were traveled with remained piles of garbage from their drying. There was no light and water in the village.

References 

Lebedyn
Lebedyn
History of Sumy Oblast
February 2022 events in Ukraine
March 2022 events in Ukraine